Pokrovka is a rural locality (a selo) and the administrative center of Pokrovskoye Rural Settlement, Leninsky District, Volgograd Oblast, Russia. The population was 772 as of 2010. There are 13 streets.

Geography 
The village is located on Caspian Depression, on the left bank of the Volozhka, 67 km from Volgograd, 36 km from Leninsk.

References 

Rural localities in Leninsky District, Volgograd Oblast